Electrification of Australian railways began with the Melbourne and Sydney suburban lines. 
Melbourne suburban lines were electrified from 1919 using . Sydney suburban lines were electrified from 1926 using the same system.

Later Australian systems used  electrification, which had been introduced in the 1950s in France, and by the 1980s become the international standard. Hence they differed from earlier systems, although as each suburban system is centred on the main city and are not interconnected, this would not cause problems. Later suburban systems were Brisbane from 1979, Perth from 1992 and Adelaide from 2014. There has also been extensive non-urban electrification in Queensland using 25 kV 50 Hz AC, mainly during the 1980s for coal routes.

Electrification systems 
Electrification of Melbourne routes was considered as far back as 1896, and in 1903 and 1907. In 1908, British engineer Charles Merz of Merz and McLellan recommended a  system to St Kilda, Port Melbourne, Sandringham and Broadmeadows using 800 V DC from a third rail. However his later 1912 report recommended  from overhead catenaries, although at the time the system was not used anywhere in the world. This proposal was approved, and his firm was appointed to supervise the work. Conversion to DC was by rotary converters, but Melbourne extensions in the 1920s from Croydon and Ringwood used mercury arc rectifiers.

Electrification of the Sydney network had been recommended by a Royal Commission in 1909, and in the Bradfield plan of 1915. John Bradfield recommended using 1,500 V DC, and this was supported by a conference of Railway Commissioners in 1922 who were anxious to avoid a repeat of the different track gauges used in each state. By this time, the 1,500 V DC system was used on railways in England, the Netherlands, France and America.  The same system was also recommended for the Brisbane suburban system in 1947-1950, although this proposal was abandoned in 1959.

In the 1950s with the standardisation of Australian industrial power generation at 50 Hz, Melbourne substations were converted to 50 Hz within the life of the 25 Hz power station at Newport (originally of  output). In Sydney, the substations were converted between 1960 and 1963.

New South Wales 

Rail electrification in Sydney commenced in 1926—see Sydney electrification. Now the entire Sydney metropolitan area, and the intercity lines to Kiama (south), Lithgow (west) and Newcastle (north) are electrified, and are served by EMU trainsets.

Sydney previously had third rail to power its former single-loop monorail, which was at 500 V AC.

Queensland 
Queensland has the most extensive electrification in Australia. It includes the entire Brisbane metropolitan area, the North Coast Line to Rockhampton and the central Queensland coalfields.

Electrification for the heavy rail lines is at 25 kV 50 Hz AC, while that for the G:link is at 750 V DC and that for the Sea World Monorail System was at 500 V AC.

South Australia 
Rail electrification in South Australia did not become a reality until the 21st century. Plans were announced in 2008 to have all four suburban lines electrified by 2018, but were delayed and later scrapped. The Seaford and Tonsley lines were the first to be electrified with services commencing in 2014, while original plans to electrify the Gawler line first were delayed in various forms until partial electrification was finalised, which began construction in late 2018  and, following significant delays and a full 18-month shut-down of the line, was completed along the entire line in June 2022 with the first service running on 12 June 2022  

Victoria 
Australia's first rail electrification was opened in Melbourne in 1919. Electrification is limited to the Melbourne metropolitan area. Previous electrification to Traralgon (opened 1956) was removed in 1987. Electrification was subsequently truncated to Pakenham in Melbourne south east.

Electrification for the heavy rail lines is at 1,500 V DC, while that for the tram lines is at 600 V DC.

Western Australia 
The first line in Perth was electrified in 1991—see Transperth Train Operations.

Electrification is at 25 kV 50 Hz AC.

Australian Capital Territory 
The ACT never previously had electrified rail.

See also 

 Rail transport in Australia

Footnotes

References

External links 

 
Australia